Granvin Church is a parish church of the Church of Norway in Voss Municipality in Vestland county, Norway. It is located on the eastern shore of the Granvinsvatnet in the small farm area called "Granvin". This place located a few kilometers north of the village of Granvin. It is the church for the Granvin parish which is part of the Hardanger og Voss prosti (deanery) in the Diocese of Bjørgvin. The white, wooden church was built in a long church design in 1726 using plans drawn up by an unknown architect. The church seats about 350 people.

History
The earliest existing historical records of the church date back to the year 1306, but it was not built that year. The first church was a wooden stave church that was likely built during the 13th century. There were covered corridors surrounding the whole stave church. In 1690–1692, the nave was extended to the west and a new tower was constructed on the west end of the newly enlarged nave. The new construction was a timber-framed building attached to the medieval stave construction. In 1726, the church was sold to two private landowners Kristoffer Aamundsen Ødven and Sivert Gundersen. At the time of the sale, the  building was described as "very rundown". Shortly thereafter, the church was torn down and replaced by a new timber-framed long church building. In 1853–1855, the church was renovated to the layout of the present-day church. The church was sold to the parish in 1857. In 1911, the church was renovated again.

Media gallery

See also
List of churches in Bjørgvin

References

Voss
Churches in Vestland
Long churches in Norway
Wooden churches in Norway
18th-century Church of Norway church buildings
Churches completed in 1726
13th-century establishments in Norway